Palair Macedonian Airlines was the national flag carrier of Republic of Macedonia (now North Macedonia) operating from Skopje and Ohrid Airports.

History

During the fall of Yugoslavia, and the establishment of an Independent Macedonian republic in the early nineties, Palair Macedonian airlines was created.
Their fleet began with a Tupolev Tu-154 but was soon followed by a leased Fokker F-28 and F-100, the planes were first in white and red, and later all red with yellow text.
When the UN dropped sanctions against Yugoslavia in 1996, Yugoslav national airline JAT Yugoslav Airlines restarted operations, leading to a drastic drop in Palair's passenger numbers.  Palair Macedonian ceased operations in September 1996.

Fleet
 Tupolev Tu-154B (4) - leased from Balkan Bulgarian Airlines and bore Bulgarian registration
 Antonov An-24 (3)
 Fokker F-28 Fellowship (2)
 Fokker F-100 (4)
 BAC 1-11-528FL - leased from Jaro International

Accident history
On 5 March 1993, Flight 301, a Fokker F-100, crashed seconds after takeoff from Skopje runway 34 on a flight to Zurich. Investigation into the accident determined the cause of the accident to be the failure of the flight crew to have the aircraft de-iced before departure. Of the 97 people on board, 83 died.

Destinations

Republic of Macedonia
Ohrid (Ohrid Airport) Base
Skopje (Skopje Airport) Base

International

Europe
Austria
Vienna (Vienna Schwechat International Airport)
Bulgaria
Sofia (Sofia International Airport)
Germany
Düsseldorf (Düsseldorf Airport)
Hamburg (Hamburg Airport)
Berlin (Berlin-Schönefeld International Airport)
Frankfurt (Main)
Stuttgart (Stuttgart Airport)
Italy
Rome (Leonardo Da Vinci International Airport)
Pisa (Pisa Airport)
Netherlands
Amsterdam (Amsterdam Schiphol Airport)
Russia
Moscow (Sheremetyevo)
Switzerland
Zürich (Zurich International Airport)

References

External links

Defunct airlines of North Macedonia
Airlines established in 1991
Airlines disestablished in 1996
1996 disestablishments in the Republic of Macedonia
Macedonian companies established in 1991